The Val d'Ille U Classic 35 was a road bicycle race held annually in France. It was organized as a 1.2 event on the UCI Europe Tour from 2010 until 2012, and as a 1.1 for its final edition in 2013. The event was last held in 2013. It was part of UCI Europe Tour in category 1.2 from 2010 to 2012, when it upgraded to 1.1 in 2013.

Winners

References

UCI Europe Tour races
Cycle races in France
2001 establishments in France
Recurring sporting events established in 2001